Cuenca, officially the Municipality of Cuenca,  is a 4th class municipality in the province of Batangas, Philippines. According to the 2020 census, it has a population of 36,235 people.

Once a part of San Jose, it became an independent town under the name "Cuenca" in 1876, after the Spanish hometown of the then-Governor of Batangas that resembles its cold breeze and beautiful scenic spots. Its main tourist attraction is the  mountain, Mount Macolod (Mount Maculot).

The Patron of Cuenca is Saint Isidore the Laborer, the patron of farmers. A celebratory feast is held annually every May 15.

Geography
According to the Philippine Statistics Authority, the municipality has a land area of  constituting  of the  total area of Batangas.

Barangays
Cuenca is politically subdivided into 21 barangays. In 1954, Don Juan was constituted as a barrio from the sitios of Lungos ng Parang, Kulit, Lumampao, Pisa, Napapanayan and Lagundian.

Climate

Demographics

In the 2020 census, Cuenca had a population of 36,235.

Economy

Gallery

References

External links

[ Philippine Standard Geographic Code]

Municipalities of Batangas
Populated places on Taal Lake